Alexander Francis Moncur (8 March 1888 – 16 June 1976) was a New Zealand politician of the Labour Party.

Biography

Moncur was born in Melbourne in 1888, and arrived in New Zealand in 1906. He was a miner on the West Coast and Waihi, then in 1910 joined the New Zealand Railways as a guard. He was in the Amalgamated Society of Railway Servants, and was Auckland branch president 1912–1921. He worked at Rotorua, and owned a taxi business at Whakatane where he became a Borough Councillor 1925–1935.

He was the unsuccessful Labour candidate for the Bay of Plenty electorate in 1928, running against Kenneth Williams who had been returned unopposed in 1922 and 1925 (and was again unopposed in 1931).

He then ran for the Rotorua electorate in 1931. He represented the Rotorua electorate from 1935 to 1943, when he was defeated by Geoffrey Sim. He was in the RNZAF 1941–1942.

Later he was the Mayor of Rotorua from 1947 to 1953.

Moncur died in 1976 and was buried at Maunu Cemetery, Whangarei.

Notes

References

1888 births
1976 deaths
New Zealand Labour Party MPs
Australian emigrants to New Zealand
New Zealand military personnel of World War II
Mayors of Rotorua
Members of the New Zealand House of Representatives
New Zealand MPs for North Island electorates
Local politicians in New Zealand
Unsuccessful candidates in the 1943 New Zealand general election
Unsuccessful candidates in the 1928 New Zealand general election
Unsuccessful candidates in the 1931 New Zealand general election
Burials at Maunu Cemetery